Ilija Barjaktarović (Paraćin, circa 1771 - Svilajnac, spring 1828) was a Serbian voivode and participant in the First Serbian Uprising.

Like most of the leading commanders, he was a merchant before he joined the rebels in 1805, right after the Serbian victory at Ivankovac. Shortly afterwards Karađorđe appointed him voivode of Paraćin Nahiya. He remained in the position of Duke (voivode) of Paraćin, until 1809 when he was sent to Deligrad where he remained until 1813. In the same year, he received the rank of Commander-in-Chief. He commanded the southeastern front, whose center was in Deligrad.

Redoubt
The triangular redoubt of Ilija Barjaktarević at Deligrad which was successfully defended by the Serbian rebel army of Karađorđe Petrović during the Battle of Deligrad in 1806:

See also
 List of Serbian Revolutionaries

References 

1771 births
1828 deaths
Dukes in Serbia
Serbian revolutionaries